The 1998–99 Cypriot Third Division was the 28th season of the Cypriot third-level football league. Chalkanoras Idaliou won their 1st title.

Format
Fourteen teams participated in the 1998–99 Cypriot Third Division. All teams played against each other twice, once at their home and once away. The team with the most points at the end of the season crowned champions. The first three teams were promoted to the 1999–2000 Cypriot Second Division and the last three teams were relegated to the 1999–2000 Cypriot Fourth Division.

Point system
Teams received three points for a win, one point for a draw and zero points for a loss.

Changes from previous season
Teams promoted to 1998–99 Cypriot Second Division
 AEZ Zakakiou
 AEK/Achilleas Ayiou Theraponta
 Anagennisi Germasogeias

Teams relegated from 1997–98 Cypriot Second Division
 Chalkanoras Idaliou
 Iraklis Gerolakkou
 APEP Pitsilia

Teams promoted from 1997–98 Cypriot Fourth Division
 SEK Agiou Athanasiou
 ATE PEK Ergaton
 Doxa Paliometochou

Teams relegated to 1998–99 Cypriot Fourth Division
 AEK Kakopetrias
 Kinyras Empas
 THOI Lakatamia

League standings

Results

See also
 Cypriot Third Division
 1998–99 Cypriot First Division
 1998–99 Cypriot Cup

Sources

Cypriot Third Division seasons
Cyprus
1998–99 in Cypriot football